Phantom is a 2012 South Korean television series, starring So Ji-sub, Lee Yeon-hee, Um Ki-joon, Kwak Do-won, and Song Ha-yoon. The police procedural tackles crimes and clues in the cyber world, weaving a massive, twist-filled mystery of murders, identity switches, corruption and conspiracy.

It aired on SBS from May 30 to August 9, 2012 on Wednesdays and Thursdays at 21:55 for 20 episodes.

Plot
Kim Woo-hyun is the only son of a prominent police officer. Determined to make his own mark, he breezes through the police academy, and along the way racks up accolades, top of the class honors, a lot of praise and perhaps envy from his colleagues. Assigned to the cyber investigations unit, Detective Kim finds himself entrenched in an intense cat and mouse game with faceless enemies in the cyber world. Tirelessly hunting a hacker named Hades, he traces the hacker's location to an apartment building and arrives just in time to witness an actress fall to her death from the high-rise.

What appears initially to be a suicide case reveals a trail of crime and conspiracy as Hades broadcasts a video clip showing a perpetrator pushing the actress to her death. Suspected to be the perpetrator, Hades is hunted down by Woo-hyun, who finds out that Hades is in fact his past roommate in the police academy, Park Ki-young. Ki-young escapes, and later infiltrates the police headquarters in search of an important evidence proving his innocence. He is caught by Yoo Kang-mi, with whom he watches a video titled 'Phantom' that reveals a murder linking right back to Woo-hyun. Ki-young once again escapes, but calls Woo-hyun to meet up with him in an abandoned factory. The factory explodes, and one died while the other suffered severe burns. In a mistaken identity, Ki-young is sent to the hospital for treatment. Ki-young recovers and assumes Woo-hyun's identity, working together with Kang-mi to defeat the enigmatic nemesis and do justice for his friend's sacrifice.

Cast

Main characters
So Ji-sub - Kim Woo-hyun / Park Ki-young 
Lee Yeon-hee - Yoo Kang-mi 
Um Ki-joon - Jo Hyun-min  
Kwak Do-won - Kwon Hyuk-joo
Song Ha-yoon - Choi Seung-yeon

Cyber Investigation Team
Kwon Hae-hyo - Han Young-seok 
G.O - Lee Tae-kyun 
Im Ji-kyu - Byun Sang-woo 
Baek Seung-hyeon - Kang Eun-jin
Bae Min-hee - Lee Hye-ram

Supporting characters
Choi Jung-woo - Shin Kyung-soo
Jang Hyun-sung - Jeon Jae-wook
Yoon Ji-hye - Goo Yeon-joo 
Jung Dong-hwan - Kim Seok-joon
Lee Tae-woo - Kim Seon-woo
Jung Moon-sung - Yeom Jae-hee
Myung Gye-nam - Jo Kyung-shin
Lee Jae-yoon - Jo Jae-min
Park Ji-il - Director Moon
Lee Ki-young - Im Chi-hyun 
Lee Won-keun - Kwon Do-young

Guest appearances
Choi Daniel - Park Gi-young / Hades (ep 1-2, 6)  
Esom - Shin Hyo-jung (ep 1)
Kim Sung-oh - Shin Hyo-jung's fan (ep 1)
Lee Joon - passerby (ep 1) 
Jung Da-hye - Jung So-eun (ep 3)
Kang Sung-min - Yang Seung-jae (ep 3-4)
Kwak Ji-min - Kwon Eun-sol (ep 7)
Han Bo-bae - Kwak Ji-soo (ep 7-8)
Ha Seung-ri - Jung Mi-young (ep 7-8)
Kim Min-ha - Kim Hee-eun 
Jin Kyung - Oh Yeon-sook 
Jung Myung-joon - TV news announcer
Jang Hang-jun - building owner 
Jeon In-taek - Jo Kyung-moon 
Kwon Tae-won - Nam Sang-won

Reception

Ratings

Awards and nominations

Original soundtrack

International broadcast
It aired in Japan on cable channel KNTV from January 27 to March 31, 2013.

In Thailand, it aired every Wednesday to Friday at 20:50 on Workpoint TV after the broadcast in South Korea ended.

Notes

References

External links
 Phantom official SBS website 
 
 

2012 South Korean television series debuts
2012 South Korean television series endings
Seoul Broadcasting System television dramas
Korean-language television shows
South Korean police procedural television series
South Korean mystery television series
South Korean crime television series
Television shows written by Kim Eun-hee
Television series by HB Entertainment